Milorad Popović  (Serbian Cyrillic: Милорад Поповић; 18 January 1979 – 19 July 2006) was a Serbian football defender who played for OFK Beograd during most of his career. Popović also played two seasons in Germany for 1. FC Nürnberg and Karlsruher SC.

Popović died in Ruma from testicular cancer at the age of 27 years. He was survived by his wife and daughter.

References

External links
 Milorad Popović at B92 
 Milorad Popović at Srbijafudbal 

1979 births
2006 deaths
Association football defenders
Serbian footballers
1. FC Nürnberg players
Karlsruher SC players
OFK Beograd players
Bundesliga players
2. Bundesliga players
Expatriate footballers in Germany
Deaths from cancer in Serbia
Deaths from testicular cancer
People from Ruma